Mateo Plehan (born 13 March 2003) is a Croatian footballer currently playing as a forward for Ponikve.

Career statistics

Club

Notes

References

2003 births
Living people
Footballers from Zagreb
Association football forwards
Croatian footballers
NK Inter Zaprešić players
Croatian Football League players
Second Football League (Croatia) players